SMS Nautilus was a German minelaying cruiser built for the Kaiserliche Marine (Imperial Navy) in the 1900s, the lead ship of the . The ship was built by AG Weser, with her keel laying taking place in December 1905. She was launched in August 1906 and commissioned in March 1907. Nautilus initially carried 186 naval mines and a battery of eight  guns, but she was later modified to carry 205 mines and, in 1918, numerous light weapons to support amphibious operations.

Nautilus spent her peacetime career conducting training exercises with the main fleet and minesweeping experiments before being placed in reserve in 1911. Reactivated at the start of World War I, she initially laid both defensive and offensive mine fields in the North and Baltic Seas. She was permanently transferred to the Baltic in 1916, and the following year she supported Operation Albion, the conquest of the Gulf of Riga. After Germany's defeat, Nautilus was demilitarized and used as a hulk from 1921 to 1928 before being sold for scrap and broken up in Copenhagen.

Design

Her crew numbered ten officers and 191 enlisted men.

Her propulsion system consisted of two triple-expansion steam engines each driving a single screw propeller, with steam supplied by four coal-fired marine-type boilers.

The primary armament for Nautilus was a battery of eight  SK L/35 guns in individual mounts. Six were placed on the superstructure amidships, with three on each broadside, and the last two were mounted side by side at the stern. She initially carried 186 naval mines, though her storage capacity was later increased to 205.

Service history
Nautilus was built by the AG Weser shipyard in Bremen; her keel was laid down as "mine steamer A" on 19 December 1905, and her completed hull was launched as Nautilus on 28 August 1906. After completing fitting-out work, the ship was commissioned for sea trials on 19 March 1907, which lasted until 25 May. She was initially used for mine warfare training and was based in Cuxhaven. Nautilus took part in the annual fleet maneuvers in August and September 1907 and 1908 before being decommissioned in Kiel; her role in the peacetime fleet was then taken over by her recently commissioned sister ship . In 1909–10, Nautilus was modernized at the Kaiserliche Werft (Imperial Shipyard) in Kiel. The work was completed by January 1910.

On 23 January, Nautilus returned to her previous role with the fleet, and she took part in the annual fleet maneuvers that year. At the end of the year, she went to Kiel for an overhaul; the work lasted from 27 December to 27 January 1911. On 4 April, she returned to Kiel, her role in the fleet again being taken by Albatross. Nautilus spent the rest of the year conducting experiments with minesweepers in the North Sea. These were interrupted only by the annual fleet exercises. On 30 October, she was again decommissioned in Kiel, having been replaced by the light cruiser  for the minesweeping experiments. She remained in reserve for over a year and a half, until she was reactivated on 5 June 1914 to replace the minelayer , which was at the time going through a major overhaul.

World War I
After the outbreak of World War I in July 1914, Nautilus was classified as a coastal defense mine cruiser. She was temporarily sent to the Baltic Sea to lay defensive minefields against a possible attack by the Russian Baltic Fleet. In late August, Nautilus and Albatross were sent to lay a minefield off the Humber and the River Tyne. The two minelayers proceeded independently, and were each covered by a light cruiser and half-flotilla of destroyers. Nautiluss group, which included the cruiser , departed from Helgoland early on the morning of 25 August. On the way back to port, the German vessels sank six British fishing vessels. Nautilus, Albatross, and the auxiliary minelayer  laid a defensive minefield in the western German Bight on 9–10 September. On 14 October 1914, Nautilus and the light cruiser  steamed into the North Sea to lay a minefield off the Firth of Forth, but upon realizing British forces were operating off the Dogger Bank, they broke off the operation and returned to port.

In April 1916, Nautilus was transferred to the Baltic after the newer, faster minelaying cruiser  entered service. Nautilus was assigned to the task force that launched Operation Albion in October 1917; she remained outside the Gulf of Riga until after the German squadron had cleared Russian forces from the area. She arrived in Arensburg on 18 October to improve the defenses of the port. On the 21st, Nautilus was to have laid mines in a channel to the west of Schildau, but the depth of the water was too shallow. Instead, Nautilus transferred her mines to some vessels from the II Minesweeper Flotilla, after which she returned to Arensburg.

In 1918, the ship's armament was revised significantly to allow the ship to support amphibious operations. Her armament now consisted of two  guns, four  anti-aircraft guns, twenty-four machine guns, two flamethrowers, and four mine-launchers, in addition to her normal capacity of mines. In February that year, she was assigned to the Sonderverband (Special Unit) tasked with supporting the anti-communist faction fighting in Finland's civil war. On 30 April, Konteradmiral (Rear Admiral) Ludolf von Uslar took command of the Sonderverband, and he chose Nautilus as his flagship. Following the disbanding of the unit the next month, Nautilus remained in the northern Baltic, patrolling off Åland, until she was decommissioned on 10 December.

Following the end of the war in late 1918, Germany was forced to sign the Treaty of Versailles, which significantly reduced Germany's naval strength. The new Reichsmarine was limited to six old pre-dreadnought battleships, six light cruisers, twelve destroyers, and twelve torpedo boats. All other vessels, to include Nautilus, were to either be sold for scrap or demilitarized. As a result, the ship was stricken from the naval register on 21 March 1919 in Kiel. From 1921, she was used as a storage hulk in Bremen, before being renamed Hulk I on 1 January 1923. She was renamed again, as Hulk A on 1 April 1928 and moved to Bremerhaven, where she was assigned to the Training Inspectorate. She remained there for just four months, before being sold for 180,000 marks and broken up in Copenhagen.

Footnotes

Notes

Citations

References

 
 
 
 
 
 

Nautilus-class minelayers
Ships built in Bremen (state)
1906 ships
World War I cruisers of Germany
World War I minelayers of Germany
Minelayers of the Imperial German Navy